Kevin Lankford (born November 16, 1998) is a professional footballer who plays as a winger for Viktoria Köln. Born in Germany, he has represented the United States at youth level.

Club career
Lankford signed his first professional contract with Heidenheim in 2017. He made his professional debut for Heidenheim on March 12, 2017, in a 1–1 draw against 1. FC Kaiserslautern in a 2. Bundesliga match.

On January 29, 2019, Lankford joined FC St. Pauli on a contract until June 2022.

International career
Lankford made his youth international debut for the United States under-19 team against Venezuela at the 2016 COTIF Tournament, coming on as a 56th-minute substitute.

References

1998 births
Living people
People from Heidenheim
Sportspeople from Stuttgart (region)
People with acquired American citizenship
American soccer players
United States men's youth international soccer players
German footballers
German people of American descent
German people of African-American descent
Association football midfielders
1. FC Heidenheim players
FC St. Pauli players
SV Wehen Wiesbaden players
2. Bundesliga players
3. Liga players
Footballers from Baden-Württemberg